Stephen Nathaniel Limbaugh Jr. (born January 25, 1952) is a Senior United States district judge of the United States District Court for the Eastern District of Missouri. From 1992 to 2008, he served as a Judge on the Supreme Court of Missouri.

Education
Limbaugh was born in Cape Girardeau, Missouri, and is the son of retired federal district judge Stephen N. Limbaugh Sr., grandson of attorney Rush Limbaugh Sr., and a cousin of prominent political commentators Rush and David Limbaugh. He earned his Bachelor of Arts degree in 1973 from Southern Methodist University. He received a Juris Doctor from the Dedman School of Law at Southern Methodist University in 1976. In 1998, he received a Master of Laws in judicial process from the University of Virginia School of Law.

Career

Following a stint in private practice in Cape Girardeau, Limbaugh was elected as Prosecuting Attorney of Cape Girardeau County at the age of 26 in 1978, serving one four-year term before returning to private practice in 1982. Beginning in 1987, he served as a Judge for the 32nd state Judicial Circuit, serving until his appointment to the Supreme Court of Missouri in 1992. From 2001 to 2003, he served one term as the state's chief justice.

Federal judicial service

On December 6, 2007, President George W. Bush nominated Judge Limbaugh to the United States District Court for the Eastern District of Missouri to fill the seat vacated by Donald J. Stohr. He was confirmed by the United States Senate on June 10, 2008, received his commission on August 1, 2008, and was succeeded on the Missouri Supreme Court by Judge Zel Fischer.  He assumed senior status on August 1, 2020.

Personal

Limbaugh currently lives in Cape Girardeau with his wife, the former Marsha D. Moore. They have two grown sons, one of them being musician Stephen Limbaugh III.

References

External links 

Stephen N. Limbaugh Jr. at the Missouri Supreme Court website

1952 births
American people of German descent
American prosecutors
Chief Justices of the Supreme Court of Missouri
Judges of the Supreme Court of Missouri
Judges of the United States District Court for the Eastern District of Missouri
Living people
People from Cape Girardeau, Missouri
Southern Methodist University alumni
Dedman School of Law alumni
United States district court judges appointed by George W. Bush
University of Virginia School of Law alumni
21st-century American judges
20th-century American lawyers
Limbaugh family